Shottle railway station is the second intermediate station on the former Midland Railway branch line to the small town of Wirksworth in Derbyshire. The line is off the Midland Main Line at Duffield railway station, the first being Hazelwood.

Shottle Railway station was reopened on 9 August 2014, by the Ecclesbourne Valley Railway.

Location
The station is located just off the A517 road, which is the main route from Belper to Ashbourne. New access has been created, and passengers can now access the station from the step entrance off the A517 Belper - Ashbourne Road, near to the cross-roads with the B5023. Disabled access is currently still under construction at this time. The road to the east of the line is private, belonging to the company which owns the station buildings. It is a request-only stop.

The nearest settlement to the station is the group of dwellings and public house at the road junction, known as Cowers Lane. However, the station is more or less equidistant from the two slightly larger settlements of Turnditch to the west, and Shottlegate to the east.

History
Opened with other stations on the branch line to Wirksworth on 1 October 1867, it was designed by the Midland Railway company architect John Holloway Sanders.

Shottle remained open until 16 June 1947, when the Wirksworth branch passenger service was withdrawn on a temporary basis in response to postwar fuel shortages.  This was made permanent with effect from May 1949, when the line was removed from the summer timetable.  Freight facilities remained rail-served at Shottle until 2 March 1964, while the branch continued to be used for mineral traffic until December 1989.

The station buildings, platform and former railway cottages remain, the former and part of the station yard being owned by a local oil distribution company who use the building as their headquarters and have repaired its structure in a sympathetic manner.  Public access to the site is limited.

The Branch is owned by WyvernRail plc and forms part of the Heritage Ecclesbourne Valley Railway.  The section of the line through Shottle is now in use by passenger services (as is the station itself that has now recently reopened to passengers for the very first time in 65 years since 1947). However, the platform is open (but the station building remains within privacy).

Principal traffic on this section comprises road/rail plant that uses the line as part of a formal acceptance procedure for the Rail Safety and Standards Board (RSSB).  To support these operations, siding space has been reinstated at the site.

During the 2012 season, a passing loop was constructed at Shottle, allowing train services to continue while the platform was being rebuilt, and the pointwork at the southern end having slewed into a Y-shape over the winter months. A temporary  speed limit is in place. As of March 2016, two-train running is now possible following completion of rebuilding work, increasing train services to approximately seven round-trip services a day.

Stationmasters

John Towler until 1873
J. Clementson 1873 - 1874 (formerly station master at Long Preston)
Eli Croft 1874 - 1876
Herbert Barber 1876 - 1908
Frederick George Arnson ca. 1912
H. Swift 1914 - 1929 (also station master at Hazelwood)
G.W. Marple 1929 - 1936 (also station master at Hazelwood until 1931, then also station master at Idridgehay, afterwards station master at Wirksworth)
A.H. Webb 1936 - 1937  (also station master at Idridgehay)
A. Harrison 1937 - 1938 (also station master at Idridgehay, afterwards station master at Little Eaton)
W. Cooke 1938 - ???? (also station master at Idridgehay)

Route

References

 Kelly's Directory of the Counties of Derby, Notts, Leicester and Rutland, pub. London (May, 1891) – Hulland – pp.234-235 Hulland is described as "3½ miles west from Shottle station"
Wirksworth – Parish Records 1608-1899 – Old Photos – Shottle Railway Station photos of the station from 1910 and 2004.

Print references

External links
 Technical note describing the test procedure for "Possession-only rail vehicles prevention of derailment assessment" which references the use of the Wirksworth Branch
 Ecclesbourne Valley Railway official website
 Ecclesbourne Valley Railway Association official website
 Statutory Instrument 1996 No. 2660:  The Duffield and Wirksworth Light Railway Order 1996
 British Railways in 1960 - the Wirksworth branch

Heritage railway stations in Derbyshire
Former Midland Railway stations
Railway stations in Great Britain opened in 1867
Railway stations in Great Britain closed in 1947
Railway stations in Great Britain opened in 2014
John Holloway Sanders railway stations